is the only natural canyon on the Isle of Man situated in Groudle Glen on the outskirts of Onchan.  This is also the name of the nearby station on the Groudle Glen Railway.  In Victorian times the canyon was fitted with many zig-zag rustic pathways, all of which have been removed but the canyon is clearly discernible from the main path, and is crossed by a footbridge at the approach to the railway's main station.

 is Manx for "lonely valley".

Landforms of the Isle of Man